Under Fire is a 1926 American silent Western film directed by Clifford S. Elfelt and starring Bill Patton, Jean Arthur, and Cathleen Calhoun.

Premise
A Seventh Cavalry officer is unjustly cashiered during his service in the Southwest on a false charge of desertion.

Cast

Preservation
A print of Under Fire is held by the Cinémathèque québécoise in Canada.

References

Bibliography
 Langman, Larry. A Guide to Silent Westerns. Greenwood Publishing Group, 1992.

External links
 

1926 films
1926 Western (genre) films
Films directed by Clifford S. Elfelt
American black-and-white films
Silent American Western (genre) films
1920s English-language films
1920s American films